Aron Sigurðarson (born 8 October 1993) is an Icelandic footballer who currently plays for AC Horsens as well as the Iceland national football team as a left winger. He previously played for Start, Tromsø and Fjölnir.

Club career
On 12 February 2016, Aron signed a three-year contract with Norwegian Tippeligaen side Tromsø IL. In February 2018, he joined Norwegian Tippeligaen side Start. On 16 December 2019 Sigurdarson signed a 2,5 year contract with Belgium side Union SG.

On 9 August 2021, Sigurðarson joined Danish NordicBet Liga club AC Horsens on a deal until June 2024.

International career
Aron made his debut for Iceland on 31 January 2016, in a friendly match against the United States in California, during which he also scored his first goal for his country.

Career statistics

Club

International

Statistics accurate as of match played 1 April 2017

International goals

References

External links

Living people
1993 births
Aron Sigurdarson
Aron Sigurdarson
Aron Sigurdarson
Aron Sigurdarson
Association football wingers
Aron Sigurdarson
Tromsø IL players
IK Start players
Royale Union Saint-Gilloise players
AC Horsens players
Aron Sigurdarson
Aron Sigurdarson
Eliteserien players
Norwegian First Division players
Challenger Pro League players
Aron Sigurdarson
Aron Sigurdarson
Aron Sigurdarson
Expatriate footballers in Norway
Expatriate footballers in Belgium
Expatriate men's footballers in Denmark